Chittoor Lok Sabha constituency is one of the twenty-five lok sabha constituencies of Andhra Pradesh in India. It comprises seven assembly segments and belongs to Chittor and Tirupati districts. Reddeppa is the present MP of the constituency representing Yuvajana Sramika Rythu Congress Party.

Assembly segments 
Chittoor constituency comprises the following Legislative Assembly segments:

Members of parliament

Election results

General Election 2014

General Election 2019

See also 
Chittoor district
List of Constituencies of the Lok Sabha

References

External links 
 Chittoor lok sabha constituency election 2019 date and schedule

Lok Sabha constituencies in Andhra Pradesh
Chittoor district